Ramone Howell (born 15 April 1995) is a Jamaican professional footballer who plays as a midfielder for Jamaican club Waterhouse and the Jamaica national team.

Early career
Born in Portmore, Jamaica, Howell played schoolboy football at Bridgeport High School and Jamaica College. He appeared for Cumberland in the Portmore U-15 Football League before moving to the youth sides at Waterhouse. Howell joined Wanderers in July 2011 and made his senior debut in the St. Catherine Major League, receiving two yellow cards. He returned to Waterhouse to begin the 2012–13 season, but after only featuring for the under-20 team, he left at the end of January to join Royal Lakes. Howell again returned to Waterhouse and made his National Premier League debut with the club during the 2013–14 season.

College and amateur
Howell played soccer at Valparaiso University from 2014 to 2017, scoring seven goals in 67 appearances. He also played for PDL side Des Moines Menace in 2016. Howell scored in Des Moines' 2–0 defeat of the Michigan Bucks in the first round of the 2017 PDL playoffs.

Club career
On 23 January 2018, Nashville SC announced the signing of Howell ahead of their inaugural USL campaign. On 13 June 2019, Nashville traded Howell to fellow USL side Phoenix Rising FC. On 25 June, Howell made his first appearance on loan with FC Tucson, the Rising's reserve team in USL League One, in a 1–0 loss to North Texas SC.

In 2021, Howell returned to his former club and re-joined Waterhouse.

Personal life
Howell's older brother, Kenroy Howell, is also a professional footballer.

Career statistics

Club

International

References

External links

 Ramone Howell at National Premier League
 
 
 
 

1995 births
Living people
Jamaican footballers
People from Saint Catherine Parish
Valparaiso University alumni
Association football midfielders
Waterhouse F.C. players
Valparaiso Crusaders men's soccer players
Des Moines Menace players
Nashville SC (2018–19) players
Inter Nashville FC players
Phoenix Rising FC players
FC Tucson players
National Premier League players
USL Championship players
USL League One players
National Premier Soccer League players
USL League Two players
Jamaica international footballers
Jamaica youth international footballers
Jamaican expatriate footballers
Expatriate soccer players in the United States
Jamaican expatriate sportspeople in the United States